Samuel James Rascoff (born  1973) is an American legal scholar and Professor of Law at New York University School of Law, regarded as an expert in national security law.

Rascoff graduated from Harvard University before attending Oxford University as a Marshall Scholar. He then graduated from Yale Law School in 2001 and clerked for Judge Pierre N. Leval of the Court of Appeals for the Second Circuit in 2002, and Justice David Souter at the Supreme Court in 2003–04. After serving as a special assistant with the Coalition Provisional Authority in Iraq, he became an associate at Wachtell, Lipton, Rosen & Katz.

A 2005 article in the New York Observer identified Rascoff as a potential future Supreme Court nominee. He is currently the faculty director of the NYU Law - NYU Tandon Master of Science in Cybersecurity Risk and Strategy program.

Selected publications

See also 
 List of law clerks of the Supreme Court of the United States (Seat 3)

References

External links 
 Website at NYU School of Law

1970s births
Living people
American legal scholars
Harvard University alumni
Marshall Scholars
Yale Law School alumni
New York University School of Law faculty
Law clerks of the Supreme Court of the United States
Wachtell, Lipton, Rosen & Katz people